The 2015 Chrono de Gatineau was held on 5 June 2015, in Gatineau, Canada. An  individual time trial cycle race for women, it was won by Carmen Small, who beat Karol-Ann Canuel and Tayler Wiles.

Results

References

Chrono Gatineau
Chrono Gatineau
Cycle races in Canada